The Word Is Live is a box set by the English progressive rock band Yes, released in August 2005 by Rhino Records. A triple album, the set is compiled of live recordings from radio broadcasts and concert tours between 1970 and 1988, mostly from guitarist Steve Howe's tape collection.

Background 
Many of the tracks were originally broadcast on radio shows and have been bootlegged extensively.  In these, it is often the case that the radio show's final mix was the only mix available so few improvements in quality could be done for the release.  While a few of the recordings (mostly those from the 1980 tour) do feature a less-than-polished quality to them, The Word Is Live is still considered a fine document of Yes in a concert setting.

The box set also comes with a 52-page book containing images and stories by Yes fans and praising retroperspectives from artists such as John Frusciante of Red Hot Chili Peppers and Geddy Lee of Rush. The opening for the book was written by Greg Lake of Emerson, Lake & Palmer.

The set includes several pieces not originally released as studio recordings by Yes, including "It's Love", an extended cover of a song by The Young Rascals, and "Go Through This" and "We Can Fly from Here" from the tour to support Drama, but which were not released on that album. The latter would eventually be reworked and released thirty-one years later in the album Fly from Here.

The title is a pun on the lyric, "(and) the word is love", from their song "Time and a Word".

Track listing

Personnel
Jon Anderson – lead vocals (1.1 – 3.2, 3.6 – 3.9)
Peter Banks – guitar, backing vocals (1.1 – 1.2)
Bill Bruford – drums (1.1 – 1.8)
Tony Kaye – keyboards (1.1 – 1.8, 3.6 – 3.9)
Chris Squire – bass, backing vocals (all)
Steve Howe – guitar, backing vocals (1.3 – 3.5)
Rick Wakeman – keyboards (2.5 – 3.2)
Alan White – drums (2.1 – 3.9)
Patrick Moraz – keyboards (2.1 – 2.4)
Geoff Downes – keyboards (3.3 – 3.5)
Trevor Horn – lead vocals (3.3 – 3.5)
Trevor Rabin – guitar, backing vocals (3.6 – 3.9)

References

Albums with cover art by Roger Dean (artist)
Yes (band) live albums
Yes (band) compilation albums
2005 live albums
2005 compilation albums
Rhino Records compilation albums
Rhino Records live albums